The 2015 Blancpain Endurance Series season was the fifth season of the Blancpain Endurance Series. The season started on 12 April at Monza and ended on 20 September at the Nürburgring. The season featured five rounds, with each race lasting for a duration of three hours besides the 24 Hours of Spa-Francorchamps and the 1000 km Paul Ricard events.

Calendar
On 3 November 2014, the Stéphane Ratel Organisation announced the 2015 calendar. The calendar was the same of the previous season.

Entry list

Results and standings

Race results

Championship standings
Scoring system
Championship points were awarded for the first ten positions in each Championship Race. Entries were required to complete 75% of the winning car's race distance in order to be classified and earn points. Individual drivers were required to participate for a minimum of 25 minutes in order to earn championship points in any race. There were no points awarded for the Pole Position.

Championship Race points

1000 km Paul Ricard points

24 Hours of Spa points
Points were awarded after six hours, after twelve hours and at the finish.

Drivers' Championship

Pro Cup

Pro-Am Cup

Am Cup

Teams' Championship

Pro Cup

Pro-Am Cup

Am Cup

See also
2015 Blancpain GT Series
2015 Blancpain Sprint Series

Notes

References

External links

2015 in motorsport
2015 in European sport